Holopsis marginicollis is a species of minute hooded beetles in the family Corylophidae. It is found in North America.

References

 Bowestead, Stanley, and Richard A. B. Leschen / Arnett, R.H. Jr., et al., eds. (2002). "Family 94. Corylophidae LeConte 1852". American Beetles, vol. 2: Polyphaga: Scarabaeoidea through Curculionoidea, 390–394.

Further reading

 Arnett, R.H. Jr., M. C. Thomas, P. E. Skelley and J. H. Frank. (eds.). (2002). American Beetles, Volume II: Polyphaga: Scarabaeoidea through Curculionoidea. CRC Press LLC, Boca Raton, FL.
 Arnett, Ross H. (2000). American Insects: A Handbook of the Insects of America North of Mexico. CRC Press.
 Richard E. White. (1983). Peterson Field Guides: Beetles. Houghton Mifflin Company.

Corylophidae